Constantinos Samaras (born 18 May 1984 in Nicosia) is a Cypriot footballer who plays for Olympiakos Nicosia as a defender and was the captain of the latter in the 2018-2019 season.

He  is a product of the Anorthosis youth academy and he has played there for all of his career except for 6 months (July 2007-January 2008) when he left the club. He rejoined them on the January transfer period
With Anorthosis he has won 2 championships and 1 cup.

Honours

Club
 Cypriot Championship (2): 2005, 2008
 Cypriot Cup (1): 2007
 Cypriot Super Cup (1): 2015

References

External links

1984 births
Living people
Cypriot footballers
Cyprus under-21 international footballers
Anorthosis Famagusta F.C. players
APOP Kinyras FC players
Ermis Aradippou FC players
Alki Larnaca FC players
Ethnikos Achna FC players
Olympiakos Nicosia players
Cypriot First Division players
Association football defenders